The Sakarya Viaduct is a  long railway bridge carrying the Ankara-Istanbul high-speed railway across the Sakarya River and its adjacent plain approximately  west of Polatlı, Turkey. The bridge is the third longest bridge in Turkey after the Osman Gazi Bridge and the Mount Bolu Viaducts as well as the longest railway bridge in the country.

Construction of the viaduct was started in 2007 and completed in 13 months. The bridge entered revenue service on 13 March 2009, with the opening of the railway from Ankara to Eskişehir.

References

Bridges completed in 2008
Railway bridges in Turkey
Buildings and structures in Ankara Province
Polatlı
Transport in Ankara Province
2009 establishments in Turkey
High-speed rail in Turkey
Turkish State Railways